Tek-Tools Software was founded in 1996 and is headquartered in Dallas, Texas. Tek-Tools' original claim-to-fame was the Simple Yet Powerful Java IDE called Kawa. Kawa was acquired by Allaire Corporation in 2000, and much of the team went with it.

Tek-Tools continued to press forward and went into the storage/backup market. The company’s Profiler Suite, has grown from a traditional server-based Storage Resource Management (SRM) application into an IT framework that has been recognized by Gartner as a Challenger in the SRM Magic Quadrant.

Profiler customers range from organizations within the private and public sectors and industries such as banking and finance, consulting and accounting, health care, insurance, manufacturing, utilities, telecommunications, education, transportation, internet service providers, and real estate.

The Profiler Suite consists of: Virtual Profiler, Storage Profiler, Backup Profiler, App Profiler and Server Profiler.

The company has also announced the release of vProfiler, its new virtualization management software designed specifically for early stage virtualization environments.

In January 2010, Tek-Tools was acquired by SolarWinds. A number of the Tek-Tools' alumni moved on to found Symphonic Source, Inc. in June 2010.

References

External links
 Official Website

Software companies based in Texas
Development software companies
Companies based in Dallas
Defunct software companies of the United States